Rangers is a 2000 American action film.

External links
Rangers at IMDb
Film page at Revolution Studios

Films directed by Jim Wynorski